ČT Déčko (shown on-air as ČT :D) is a Czech free-to-air television channel operated by Czech Television, specialising in children's content designed for young viewers 2 to 12 years of age. The channel began broadcasting on 31 August 2013, with Petr Koliha as its first executive director.

ČT Déčko broadcasts from 6 am to 8 pm, and shares its frequency with cultural channel ČT art which uses the remaining hours.

History 
The channel dedicated to young audience was a part of Petr Dvořák's candidate project for the position of CEO of Česká televize. In September 2012, executive director Petr Koliha, former artistic director of the Zlín Film Festival for Children and Youth, was appointed three months later as creative producer for children's work Barbara Johnson. Thanks to the transfer of children's and cultural programs to ČT: D and ČT art, the ČT2 program should focus more on educational and cognitive programs and strengthen Czech documentaries.

Previously, the TV channel ČT :D was broadcast as ČT3. ČT3 aired from 1 January 1993 to 3 February 1994.

Česká televize gradually registered possible names and graphic design of the logo at the Industrial Property Office. Possible suggestions included ČT Juni, ČT D, ČT children, ČT Hi, ČT mini, mini ČT, ČT hele and selected ČT :D, which is to symbolize a smile.

Programming 
The station is open daily from 6.00 am to 8.00 pm, the TV channel ČT art broadcasts on the same frequency between 8 pm and the second morning.

ČT :D is intended for two audience groups, namely for children aged 4–8 (57% of broadcasts) and for children aged 8–15 (43% of broadcasts).

Future 
Česká televize stated in 2015 that if ČT Déčko and ČT art proved to be successful, the two channels would broadcast from separate frequencies allowing them to broadcast 24-hours a day. As of 2023, however, this has not happened yet.

Availability 
Television broadcasts its program in multiplex 1a (which was created by extending the originally planned regional networks 7, 10, 20). From 9 October 2013 to 31 March 2018 it also spread its signal in the nationwide Multiplex 3, with the newly established Prima Krimi channel taking over. From 24 April 2018, ČT :D / art is available in Multiplex 1. On 29 March 2018 it broadcasts in high definition in the transition network 11. ČT :D/ČT art HD is also available via satellite, cable TV and IPTV.

Criticism 
After launching the broadcast, the program ČT :D and, consequently, the sister program ČT art, which are broadcast on multiplex 1a, became a target of criticism due to the inability to tune this program. The most frequent reasons are insufficient signal coverage or the necessary change in the antenna system. Critics claim that the announced coverage of 80% of the territory of the Czech Republic by the multiplex 1a signal is unrealistic, and that even in areas where such coverage is already required, either a new antenna must be purchased, or the existing antenna must be redirected to a signal source, that again loses the signal from other Multiplexes. The Chair of the Association of Directors and Screenwriters Ljuba Wenceslas wrote a complaint to the chairman of the Czech Television Council, Milan Uhda, to explain the situation.

Broadcasting

HD 
High-definition (HD) broadcasting via satellite was started on 1 November 2016 using Astra 3B-capacities.

References

External links
Official website

Television stations in the Czech Republic
Television channels and stations established in 2013
Children's television networks
Czech-language television stations
Czech Television